Robert Read (December 11, 1814 – June 29, 1896) was an Ontario businessman and political figure. He represented Hastings East in the 1st Canadian Parliament as a Conservative until February 24, 1871 when he was named to the Senate of Canada for Quinte division.

He was born at Fressingfield in Suffolk, England in 1814, the son of Robert Read, and came to Upper Canada in 1836, settling at Belleville. Read was a farmer, distiller and tanner. He also served as director of the Grand Trunk Railway. He was elected to the Legislative Council of the Province of Canada for Quinte in 1862 and then was elected to the House of Commons after Confederation.

In 1840, Read married Margaret Campion. He died in office in 1896.

References 

1814 births
1896 deaths
Members of the Legislative Council of the Province of Canada
Conservative Party of Canada (1867–1942) MPs
Members of the House of Commons of Canada from Ontario
Canadian senators from Ontario
People from Fressingfield